Valeria Rocio Diaz (born December 27, 1984) is an Argentine actress and singer.

Biography
Diaz debuted as a television actress during 1994, in the program "Cara Bonita". In 1995 she joined "Parchis" a popular Children musical group 
(not to be confused with the Spanish children's band of around the same era), as a singer. In 1997, she left Parchis and began to play "Delfina" in a Telefe telenovela, "Chiquititas". She played Ezequiel Castano's "Mosca"'s romantic interest, "Delfina", which also became known as "Dama del Mar" ("Lady of the Seas") during the show. Valeria Diaz played Celeste Cid's "Barbarita"'s best friend in Chiquititas.

Diaz retired from "Chiquititas" in 1998, and Performed small parts in several TV programmes of Telefe.

Diaz has Three sisters, Julieta, Brenda and Nadia. She enlists Aruba as her favorite holiday destination..

See also
List of Argentines

External links 
 

1984 births
Living people
Argentine actresses
Place of birth missing (living people)